The Lago di Candia is a small, shallow Italian lake of glacial origin, located by the town of Candia Canavese in the Piedmontese province of Turin. The lake forms the centre of an environmentally important wetland area which, as the Parco naturale del Lago di Candia, became a nature reserve in 1995.

References
 
 

Candia
Canavese
Nature reserves in Italy
Metropolitan City of Turin